Aspades luteomaculata is a species of moth in the family Gelechiidae. It was described by Oleksiy V. Bidzilya and Wolfram Mey in 2011. It is found in Namibia.

References

Pexicopiini
Moths described in 2011
Moths of Africa